Jessie Lilley is an American writer, editor and small-press magazine publisher best known as the original publisher of Scarlet Street magazine. She is currently editor-in-chief of Mondo Cult. magazine.

Lilley began publishing Scarlet Street in 1990 before her association with a number of small-press film magazines like RetroVision, Chiller Magazine, Worldly Remains: A Pop Culture Review, Cinefantastique, Scary Monsters, Femme Fatales, Little Shoppe of Horrors and the recent re-launch of Famous Monsters of Filmland. One of the first women active in this area of publishing, Lilley was a Monster Kid Hall of Fame Inductee at the 2012 Rondo Awards. She has edited two books - You Grew Up: the Life and Career of Paul Reed, Sr. and Gloria, the memoir of Bond girl Gloria Hendry.

She has small roles in a few direct-to-video features  and was an occasional guest of Joe Franklin's on WWOR-TV. She is married to musician David Paul Campbell with whom she founded Mudbug International Records. They live in Santa Cruz County, CA.

Chairs

 Monterey Bay News & Views (California Central Coast) - Writer
 Cinefantastique (print) - Editor
 Valley Scene Magazine (LA) - Writer
 Mondo Cult - Editor-In-Chief 
 Famous Monsters of Filmland - Editor 
 Mondo Cult - President and Publisher
 Femme Fatales - Writer
 SPFX - Writer
 RetroVision - Managing Editor
 Scarlet Street - President and Publisher

References

Living people
American editors
1958 births